The New Fork River is the uppermost major tributary of the Green River in Wyoming, flowing about  entirely within Sublette County. It drains an arid farming region of southwestern Wyoming south of the Wind River Range.

Course
From there it swings south then southeast, past Cora and on to Pinedale, receiving Willow, Pine and Pole Creeks from the left. At Boulder it receives Boulder Creek and turns south again. The East Fork River joins a few miles south of there.

Recreation
The New Fork is considered an excellent river for inner-tube floating and canoeing because of its width and strong but not dangerous current. The river and many of its tributaries also have good fishing especially in the upper reaches. However, most of the river course is isolated and aside from the three small towns along its course (Cora, Pinedale and Boulder) there are few significant settlements of any size nearby.

See also
List of rivers of Wyoming

References

Rivers of Wyoming
Rivers of Sublette County, Wyoming
Tributaries of the Green River (Colorado River tributary)